Sir Godfrey Seymour Tearle (12 October 1884 – 9 June 1953) was a British actor who portrayed the quintessential British gentleman on stage and in both British and US films.

Biography
Born in New York City and brought up in Britain, he was the son of British actor/manager George Osmond Tearle (1852–1901) and American actress Marianne "Minnie" Conway (1852-1896), the brother of actor Malcolm Tearle, and the half-brother of silent film star Conway Tearle. His maternal grandmother was Sarah Crocker Conway.

In 1893, he made his stage debut as young Prince Richard, Duke of York, in his father's production of Richard III and in 1908 he appeared in his first film as Romeo in Romeo and Juliet. He became a Shakespearean actor of note, appearing on stage in the title roles of Othello, Macbeth and Henry V. His theatrical career was interrupted when he joined the Royal Artillery for a four-year stint beginning in 1915. In 1924 he starred in the West End production of Frederick Lonsdale's drama The Fake. In 1935 he appeared in Bernard Merivale's The Unguarded Hour.

One of Tearle's most memorable screen roles was in Alfred Hitchcock's The 39 Steps (1935), in which he portrayed Professor Jordan, a seemingly respectable country squire whose missing finger unmasks him as an enemy agent. He was cast as an RAF gunner in One of Our Aircraft Is Missing (1942), a German general in Undercover (film) (1943), an aging First World War veteran in Medal for the General (1944) and as Franklin D. Roosevelt in The Beginning or the End, MGM's 1946 account of the Manhattan Project.

Tearle made his Broadway theatre debut in Carnival in 1919. In his review in The New York Times, Alexander Woollcott noted, "It is difficult to guess why Godfrey Tearle should have selected as the vehicle of his American debut the play called Carnival, which was presented to New York for the first time last evening at the 44th Street Theatre. It is a spare and unsubstantial piece at best, and the role it offers him is distinctly secondary in importance and opportunity." Additional Broadway credits include The Fake (1924), The Flashing Stream (1939), and Antony and Cleopatra (1947).

Knighthood
Tearle was knighted in the 1951 King's Birthday Honours List for services to drama.

Marriages
He was married three times, to actress Mary Malone from 1909 until their divorce in 1932, to starlet Stella Freeman from 1932 until her sudden death in 1936, and to Barbara Palmer from 1937 until their divorce in 1947. 

For several years at the end of his life, Tearle lived with the actress Jill Bennett.

Death
Sir Godfrey Tearle died on 9 June 1953, aged 68.

Complete filmography

Romeo and Juliet (1908 short) - Romeo
The Fool (1913) - Sterndale
Lochinvar (1915 short) - Lochinvar
Sir James Mortimer's Wager (1915 short) - Sir James Mortimer
The Real Thing at Last (1916 short) - Macduff
The March Hare (1919) - Guy
 A Sinless Sinner (1919) - Tom Harvey
Fancy Dress (1919) - Tony Broke
Nobody's Child (1919) - Ernest d'Alvard
Queen's Evidence (1919) - Adam Pascal
Salome of the Tenements (1925) - John Manning
Guy of Warwick (1926 short) - Guy of Warwick
If Youth But Knew (1926) - Dr. Martin Summer
One Colombo Night (1926) - Jim Farnell
 Infatuation (1930 short) - Gerald Norton 
These Charming People (1931) - James Berridge
The Shadow Between (1931) - Paul Haddon
Puppets of Fate (1933) - Richard Sabine
Jade (1934 short) - The Man
The 39 Steps (1935) - Professor Jordan
The Last Journey (1936) - Sir Wilfred Rhodes
East Meets West (1936) - Sir Henry Mallory
Tomorrow We Live (1936) - Sir Charles Hendra
One of Our Aircraft Is Missing (1942) - Sir George Corbett - Rear Gunner in B for Bertie
Tomorrow We Live (1943) - Mayor Pierre Duchesne
Undercover (1943) - Gen. Von Staengel
The Lamp Still Burns (1943) - Sir Marshall Freyne
Medal for the General (1944) - General Church
The Rake's Progress (1945) - Colonel Robert Kenway
The Beginning or the End (1947) - President Roosevelt
Private Angelo (1949) - Count Piccologrando
White Corridors (1951) - Mr. Groom Sr.
I Believe in You (1952) - Mr. Pyke
Mandy (1952) - Mr. Garland
Decameron Nights (1953) - Ricciardo / Bernabo
The Titfield Thunderbolt (1953) - The Bishop

References

Sources
 Halliwell's Who's Who in the Movies - published by Harper-Collins - 
 Guide to Movies & Videos  published by Dell -

External links

 
 

1884 births
1953 deaths
Actors awarded knighthoods
Male actors from London
English male silent film actors
English male film actors
English male stage actors
British male Shakespearean actors
20th-century English male actors
American emigrants to England
Knights Bachelor
American people of British descent
British Army personnel of World War I
Royal Artillery personnel
Military personnel from New York City